Professor Martin Thomas (born 1964) is a British historian.

Thomas did both his undergraduate and doctoral studies at Oxford University, completing his D.Phil. in 1991. He joined the history department at the University of the West of England, Bristol, in 1992 before leaving to take up a post at the History Department of Exeter University in 2003. He is the director of the Centre for the Study of War, State and Society.

He is considered one of the leading specialists on French colonial history and, in November 2002, was awarded a £50,000 prize from the Leverhulme Trust for the outstanding quality of his research. He has published five monographs on aspects of French foreign and colonial policy, Franco-British relations, colonial security services and the colonial state.

He has been on the editorial boards of The International History Review and Intelligence and National Security.

Works

 Paperback 2007.

(co-editor with Kent Fedorowich), 

 Paperback 2007.

References
 Exeter University profile

1964 births
Living people
British historians
Historians of France
Academics of the University of the West of England, Bristol
Academics of the University of Exeter
Alumni of the University of Oxford
Historians of World War II
Historians of Vichy France